Marumba tigrina is a species of moth of the family Sphingidae first described by Bruno Gehlen in 1936. It is found in Sumatra, Java and Borneo.

References

Marumba
Moths described in 1936